Bellevue Chapel is a church in Rodney Street in Canonmills, Edinburgh, Scotland.

History
This building, built 1878–1881, was originally a Lutheran place of worship for German residents of Edinburgh and those that were building the Forth Bridge.

After the First World War in 1919 one of the Christian Brethren meetings in Edinburgh, meeting at Picardy Place, itself founded in 1891, moved into this building and it was renamed Bellevue Chapel. (Another Brethren meeting gathered at Lochrin Place, later moving to Lauriston Place and then, in 1967, to what is now Bruntsfield Evangelical Church.)

The scholar, F. F. Bruce, joined this meeting when he arrived in Edinburgh to teach at the university in 1935 (leaving in 1938 to teach in England).

References

External links
 Official website

Open Brethren churches in the United Kingdom
Churches in Edinburgh
Churches completed in 1880
19th-century churches in the United Kingdom
19th century in Scotland
Evangelical churches in the United Kingdom
Chapels in Scotland